Beta Hydri (β Hyi, β Hydri) is a star in the southern circumpolar constellation of Hydrus. (Note that Hydrus is not the same as Hydra.) With an apparent visual magnitude of 2.8, this is the brightest star in the constellation.

This star has about 104% of the mass of the Sun and 181% of the Sun's radius, with more than three times the Sun's luminosity. The spectrum of this star matches a stellar classification of G2 IV, with the luminosity class of 'IV' indicating this is a subgiant star. As such, it is a slightly more evolved star than the Sun, with the supply of hydrogen at its core becoming exhausted. It is one of the oldest stars in the solar neighborhood. This star bears some resemblance to what the Sun might look like in the far distant future, making it an object of interest to astronomers.

Search for planets

In 2002, Endl et al. inferred the possible presence of an unseen companion orbiting Beta Hydri as hinted by radial velocity linear trend with a periodicity exceeding 20 years. A substellar object such as a planet with a minimum mass of 4 Jupiter masses and orbital separation of roughly 8 AU could explain the observed trend. If confirmed, it would be a true Jupiter-analogue, though 4 times more massive. So far no planetary/substellar object has been certainly detected.

These results were not confirmed in CES and HARPS measurements published on the arXiv in 2012. Instead the long-term radial velocity variations may be caused by the star's magnetic cycle.

See also
List of nearest bright stars

References

External links
 
 
 Stellar Activity - Beta Hydri

Hydri, Beta
Hydrus (constellation)
G-type subgiants
Hydri, Beta
Hypothetical planetary systems
Zeta Herculis Moving Group
002021
002151
0098
0019
CD-77 00015
Southern pole stars